The S.H. Ho College is one of the new colleges of The Chinese University of Hong Kong which admitted its first class of students in 2010. It is named after S. H. Ho (Ho Sin Hang), the Hong Kong businessman who founded Hang Seng Bank.

In August 2006, Professor Samuel Sun, a professor of biology in CUHK, was appointed Founding Master of S.H. Ho College.

Motto
The motto of the college is "Culture, Morals, Devotion, Trustworthiness".

Site
It is located in between the central campus and the existing Chung Chi College, and is next to another new college, Morningside College.

System
The S.H. Ho College, along with the Morningside College and the CW Chu College, are the first colleges in The Chinese University of Hong Kong operating on a fully residential and communal dining basis. All undergraduates belonging to S.H. Ho College are required to take up residency in the hostels of the college, and attend communal dinners three times a week.

With a resident population of 600 students, S.H. Ho College is the largest of the three colleges adopting this system.

References

External links
 S.H. Ho College
 Facebook Page: 善衡書院 S.H. Ho College

Chinese University of Hong Kong